Aldisa fragaria is a species of sea snail, a marine gastropod mollusk, in the family Cadlinidae.

Distribution
This species occurs in Mozambique.

References

fragaria
Gastropods described in 2017